Alex Evans (born 17 September 1992) is a Welsh footballer who plays for Aberbargoed Buds.

He has previously played for Cardiff City and Oxford United.

Club career
Evans  began his career with his local side Treharris Western, joining Cardiff academy at an early age of 9. Alongside Nathaniel Jarvis he  signed  schoolboy forms at the start of the 2008–09 season. On 23 May 2011, Evans was offered his first professional contract by Cardiff City alongside Ibrahim Farah and Nathaniel Jarvis. He made his debut in a 3-1 EFL Cup win over Oxford United, where he started next to Gábor Gyepes. At the end of the season, Evans was released by the club.

Following his release, Evans joined Oxford United on trial during their pre-season tour to the United States. He also played against former club Cardiff City in a 2–1 loss to the Bluebirds. He signed non-contract terms with the club on 13 August 2012.

He signed for Aberbargoed Buds in August 2021.

Club stats 

As of 12 August 2011

References

1992 births
Living people
People from Treharris
Sportspeople from Merthyr Tydfil County Borough
Welsh footballers
Cardiff City F.C. players
Oxford United F.C. players
English Football League players
Association football defenders
Goytre United F.C. players
Afan Lido F.C. players
Aberbargoed Buds F.C. players